Tapirira obtusa is a species of plant in the family Anacardiaceae. It is native to Cerrado vegetation in Brazil.

References

obtusa
Flora of Brazil
Flora of the Cerrado